Schlüsselgrund is a small river of Hesse and North Rhine-Westphalia, Germany. It flows into the Calenberger Bach near Warburg.

See also
List of rivers of Hesse

References

Rivers of Hesse
Rivers of North Rhine-Westphalia
Rivers of Germany